Varenne is a station on Line 13 of the Paris Métro. Located in the 7th arrondissement, it is named after the Rue de Varenne.

History
The station opened on 20 December 1923 as part of the original section of Line 10 between Invalides and Croix-Rouge (a station east of Sèvres-Babylone, which was closed during World War II). On 27 July 1937 the section of Line 10 between Invalides and Duroc was transferred to become the first section of the old Line 14, which was connected under the Seine and incorporated into Line 13 on 9 November 1976.

The Rue de Varenne runs east from the station. It has been closely associated with the Government of France, since the President of the Council of Ministers (equivalent to Prime Minister under the Third and Fourth Republics) settled in the nearby Hôtel Matignon in January 1935. Other ministries are also located in the private mansions of the district. During World War II, the station was closed because the government was in Vichy and the private mansions, which had housed ministries, were deserted. Since the establishment of the Fifth Republic in 1958, the Hôtel Matignon has been the official residence of the Prime Minister of France.

Nearby are the Musée Rodin (Rodin Museum) and Les Invalides.

Station layout

Gallery

References
Roland, Gérard (2003). Stations de métro. D’Abbesses à Wagram. Éditions Bonneton.

Paris Métro stations in the 7th arrondissement of Paris
Railway stations in France opened in 1923